Mordecai Ardon (13 July 1896 – 18 June 1992) was an Israeli painter.

Biography

Max Bronstein (later Mordecai Ardon) was born in Tuchów, Galicia (then Austria-Hungary, now Poland). In 1933 he immigrated to Mandate Palestine, settling in Jerusalem. He was granted British Mandatory Palestinian citizenship in 1936 and changed his name to Mordecai Ardon.

Art career
He participated in the Venice Biennale of 1968.

Beginning in the 1950s Ardon adopted a complex system of symbolic images in his paintings, taken from the Jewish Mystical tradition (Kabbalah), from the Bible and from a tangible reality. In his painting "Gates of Light", for example, he expressed "the inner mystery and timelessness of the landscape." His work seeks to impart a cosmic dimension to the present, linking it to antiquity and mystery. The same approach can be found in "At the Gates of Jerusalem" (1967), which shows the attempt to "convey his feelings about the cosmic significance of Israel’s return to the Old City of Jerusalem during the Six-Day War". "Bird near a yellow wall" (1950) demonstrates his simplistic involvement with the Holocaust, a subject to which he was one of the few Israeli artists to devote a phase of his work, at that time.

As a teacher and director of the "New Bezalel", Ardon conveyed his sense of social involvement, his tendency towards Jewish mysticism and local mythology, and the combination of personal national symbols with reality-always stressing masterful technique. Pupils such as Avigdor Arikha, Yehuda Bacon, Naftali Bezem, Shraga Weil and Shmuel Boneh absorbed these influences and integrated them into their later work.

Ardon was seen as the father of the regional approach in Israeli art.

One of his most famous creations are the "Ardon Windows" (1980–1984), a set of large stained-glass windows displayed prominently in the National Library of Israel in Jerusalem, incorporating visual elements from the Kabbalah.

Ardon died in Jerusalem in 1992.

In 2014 his painting "The Awakening" (1969) was sold at Sotheby's for $821,000.
In 2006 his painting "The Woodpecker of Time" (1963) was sold at Christie's for $643,200.

Education 
 1920-25 Bauhaus School, Weimar, Germany, with Itten, Klee, Kandinsky, Feininger
 1926 Studied with Max Doerner

Teaching 
 1929 Kunstschule Itten, Berlin
 1935 Seminar, Bet Hakerem, Jerusalem
 1935-52 Bezalel, Jerusalem
 1940-52 Bezalel, Jerusalem, Director
 1952-63 Ministry of Education and Culture, Jerusalem, Supervisor and Art Advisor

Awards and recognition
 1954 Unesco Prize
 1963, Ardon was awarded the Israel Prize, in painting.
 1974, he received the Yakir Yerushalayim (Worthy Citizen of Jerusalem) award.
 1974 Doctor of Honor, Hebrew University of Jerusalem
 1988 Boris Schatz Prize
 1992 Isracard Prize, Tel Aviv Museum

See also
 List of Israel Prize recipients
Israeli art

References

External links 

 
 
 
 Ardon's art

Bauhaus alumni
Israeli stained glass artists and manufacturers
Israel Prize in painting recipients
Jewish painters
Austro-Hungarian Jews
Jews from Galicia (Eastern Europe)
Jews in Mandatory Palestine
Jewish Israeli artists
Polish emigrants to Mandatory Palestine
People from Tarnów County
1896 births
1992 deaths
20th-century Israeli painters
20th-century Israeli male artists